Julio Serrano Echeverría (born 1983 in Quetzaltenango, Guatemala) is a Guatemalan writer, poet, and filmmaker.

He is the founder of the publishing house Libros Mínimos, one of the first Guatemalan publishers in offering publications for free download. He was one of the initiators of the International Festival of Poetry of Quetzaltenango. Many of his poems, short stories, and literature articles have been published in Guatemalan magazines and newspapers, as well as in anthologies and print and online publications. He has been invited to take part in international poetry and literature festivals.

Echeverría, representing Libros Mínimos, is a member of Colectivo Cuatro Caminos. On August 5, 2010,  the first screening of the documentary "Vidas Ambulantes" (Ambulant Lives) took place, produced and directed by Colectivo Cuatro Caminos.

Writings 

 Las Palabras y los Días (Editorial Cultura, 2006)
 Trans 2.0 Trans 2.0 (Libros Mínimos, 2009)
 Sin Casaca(Librovisor / Centro Cultural de España/Guatemala, 2008)
 Fridom no fir (Libros Mínimos, 2009)
 Cuento Macho (Libros Mínimos, 2009)]

Other Projects 
 Colectivo Cuatro Caminos
 Cadalzo Chapín
 Libros Mínimos

References

External links
  Writer's Blog.
 Julio Serrano Echeverría in La Página de Literatura Guatemalteca
 Interview
 International Festival of Poetry of Quetzaltenango
 Colectivo Cuatro Caminos
 About the Author in Libros Mínimos
 Julio Serrano Echeverría in Instituto Cervantes of Albuquerque
 About the Author in the culture magazine "Magacín" from SigloXXI
 Article about Libros Mínimos on the page of the Frankfurt Book Fair
 About Trans 2.0

Sources 
 About the Author and Las Palabras y los Días, First Book of Julio Serrano
 Interview with the Author about las Las Palabras y los Días in elPeriodico
 About the new Publishing Houses in Guatemala, also Libros Mínimos in the elPeriodico newspaper
 Sixth International Poetry Festival Ciudad de Granada, Spain
 International Poetry Festival in Granada, Nicaragua

21st-century Guatemalan poets
21st-century male writers
Guatemalan male poets
Guatemalan male short story writers
Guatemalan short story writers
1983 births
Living people
21st-century short story writers